Robert Hilliard was an Olympic boxer, Irish republican, Church of Ireland minister and communist.

Robert Hilliard may also refer to:
 Robert C. Hilliard (actor), American stage actor
 Robert C. Hilliard (attorney), American civil rights and personal injury attorney

See also
 Bob Hilliard (Hilliard Goldsmith), American lyricist